Steven Robertson (born 1 January 1977) is a Scottish actor who stars as Detective Sandy Wilson in the BBC One adaptation of Ann Cleeves's Shetland, filmed near where Robertson was born and brought up. He portrayed Michael Connelly, a young man with cerebral palsy, in Inside I'm Dancing, and played Dominic Rook in the popular BBC Three comedy-drama series Being Human. He has had roles in numerous television programs including Luther and The Bletchley Circle.

Personal life
Robertson grew up in the small village of Vidlin in the Shetland Islands of Scotland, with his two sisters. In his childhood, Robertson battled and overcame severe dyslexia. Before pursuing an acting career, he worked as an odd-job man in his village. Growing up, he was close to the Shetland poet Rhoda Bulter. He stated that she was the trigger for him pursuing a career in performing by telling him old Shetland tales. Robertson attended the Guildhall School of Music and Drama. While there he met his wife, actress Charlotte Allam. He is also a member of Aya Theatre and has starred in their adaptation of George Orwell's Burmese Days as Flory. He currently lives in Hertfordshire with his wife and daughter.

Career
Robertson's first major film role came in 2004 when he starred alongside fellow Scottish actor James McAvoy in Inside I'm Dancing.

He then went on to play a small part in the 2005 film Kingdom of Heaven as an Angelic Priest. Following this, he had a big role in the 2005 French war film Joyeux Noël in which he played Jonathan, a young man whose brother was shot dead during WW1. Robertson then went on to play characters in numerous TV dramas, including Luther, where he played both of the Millberry twins, a murderous duo who decided their victim's fate on the roll of a dice.

Robertson then played Dominic Rook, a government leader whose department protects the world from supernaturals in series 5 of the British supernatural drama Being Human.

He later worked on series 2 of Utopia, a British conspiracy thriller for Channel 4 where he played the role of Terrence.

Shetland
Robertson returned to his home in Shetland to film the TV series of the same name, where he starred as Constable Sandy Wilson in the BBC One adaptation of the popular Ann Cleeves book series. The show was criticised for its lack of Shetland accents, with Robertson being the only main cast member born and brought up on the islands. However, the series attracted over 6 million viewers and a second series was commissioned featuring, alongside Douglas Henshall and Robertson, actors Brian Cox, Julie Graham and Alex Norton, with Robertson's character now a detective. Robertson stated to Digital Spy that his portrayal of Wilson was a "nice break from playing killers and creeps". A third series, telling a single story, aired in 2016.

Robertson returned as DC Wilson for the fourth series which was broadcast in early 2018, the fifth series which was broadcast in early 2019 and the sixth in 2021.

Filmography

Film
Inside I'm Dancing (2004) (also released under the title Rory O'Shea Was Here) as Michael Connolly 
Kingdom of Heaven (2005) as the Angelic Priest 
Joyeux Noël (2005) as Jonathan
True North (2006) as The Cook
 Elizabeth: The Golden Age (2007) as Francis Throckmorton
Neds (2010) as Mr Bonetti
The Tourist (2010) as Junior Technician Pinnock
5 Days of War (2011) as Davit Kezerashvili
The Somnambulists (2012) as Man 12
T2 Trainspotting (2017) as Francis Begbie's lawyer
Tell It to the Bees (2018) as Jim

TV
 E=mc² (2005) as Michael Faraday
 He Kills Coppers (2008) as Tony Meehan
 Tess of the d'Urbervilles (2008) as Cuthbert Clare
 Shameless (2009) as Padraig Maguire, deceased father of Paddy Maguire seen in a nightmare
 Red Riding (2009) as Sergeant Bob Fraser
 Hustle (2009) 
 Ashes to Ashes (2010) as Paul Thordy
 Luther (2011) as Robert/Nicholas Millberry
 Parade's End as Colonel Bill Williams, CO (2012) 
 Being Human (2012-Guest, 2013-Regular) as Dominic Rook
 The Bletchley Circle (2012) as Malcolm Crowley
 Shetland (2013–present) as Detective Constable Sandy Wilson
 New Tricks (2013) as Tim Belgrade
 Utopia (2014) as Terrence
 In the Flesh (2014) as John Weston
 Doctor Who (2015) as Richard Pritchard
 Harlots (2017) as Robert Oswald
 Vera (2018) as Tom Naresby
 The Bay (2021) as Mark Bradwell

Stage
King Lear (2002) as Kent (Royal Shakespeare Company Academy)
The Seagull (2003) as Konstantin Gavrilovich Treplyov (Royal Exchange, Manchester)
Antony and Cleopatra as Octavian (Royal Exchange, Manchester)
The Tempest (2007) as Ariel (Royal Exchange, Manchester)
Ghosts (2009) as Oswald Alving (Citizens Theatre)

References

External links

Shetlopedia.com – Steven Robertson page

1977 births
Living people
People from Shetland
People educated at Anderson High School, Lerwick
Scottish male film actors
Scottish male stage actors
Scottish male television actors
Alumni of the Guildhall School of Music and Drama
British male film actors
21st-century Scottish male actors